Tropidauchenia is a genus of air-breathing land snails, terrestrial pulmonate gastropod mollusks in the tribe Tropidauchenia  of the subfamily Garnieriinae in the family Clausiliidae, the door snails.

Species
 Tropidauchenia bavayi (Lindholm, 1924)
 Tropidauchenia danjuan L. Qiu, 2021
 Tropidauchenia donggiaensis H. Nordsieck, 2002
 Tropidauchenia dorri (Bavay & Dautzenberg, 1899)
 Tropidauchenia fischeri H. Nordsieck, 2002
 Tropidauchenia giardi (H. Fischer, 1898)
 Tropidauchenia hitomiae H. Nordsieck, 2007
 Tropidauchenia lucida H. Nordsieck, 2007
 Tropidauchenia mengyuanensis Y.-X. Chen, 2016
 Tropidauchenia messageri (Bavay & Dautzenberg, 1899)
 Tropidauchenia nakaharai H. Nordsieck, 2007
 Tropidauchenia napoensis H. Nordsieck, 2007
 Tropidauchenia ootanii H. Nordsieck, 2007
 Tropidauchenia orientalis (Mabille, 1887)
 Tropidauchenia palatalis H. Nordsieck, 2011
 Tropidauchenia parasulcicollis L. Qiu, 2021
 Tropidauchenia proctostoma (Mabille, 1889)
 Tropidauchenia sulcicollis Grego & Szekeres, 2017
 Tropidauchenia yanghaoi Grego & Szekeres, 2017
Synonyms
 Tropidauchenia (Neniauchenia) amoena H. Nordsieck, 2002: synonym of Grandinenia amoena (H. Nordsieck, 2002)

References

 Lindholm, W. A. (1924). A revised systematic list of the genera of the Clausiliidae, recent and fossil, with their subdivisions, synonymy, and types. Proceedings of the Malacological Society of London.
 Lindholm, W. A. (1924). A revised systematic list of the genera of the Clausiliidae, recent and fossil, with their subdivisions, synonymy, and types. Proceedings of the Malacological Society of London.

Clausiliidae